Harry Corbett (1918–1989) was an English puppeteer, magician and presenter.

Harry Corbett may also refer to:

Harry Corbett (boxer) (1904–1957), English boxer
Harry H. Corbett (1925–1982), English actor
Harry Corbett (footballer) (born 1943), Australian rules footballer

See also
Harold Corbett (1892–1917), Australian rugby player
Henry Corbett (disambiguation)
Corbett (surname)